Faik Ibrahim Haddad ( [Fā'iq Ḥaddād], b. 28 December 1914 Tulkarm; d. 23 January 2001 Amman) was the 11th bishop of Jerusalem, he was the first bishop of Arabic descent to head the diocese. He was also a Chaplain of the Order of Saint John.

Background and education

Haddad was born in Tulkarm city on 28 December 1914 into a Palestinian family that had been active in Anglican life in the area. He grew up in Tulkarm city, and was educated in his city schools, then he was educated at St. George's School, Jerusalem and the American University of Beirut.

Early career
Haddad was ordained deacon in 1939 and priested in 1940, both by the 7th bishop, Francis Brown. After a curacy at Acre he served at Jaffa, Amman and Nablus.

Later career

In 1971 he was appointed a Canon Residentiary at St. George's Cathedral, Jerusalem and served there until his consecration as Coadjutor Bishop of Jerusalem on 29 August 1974. He became diocesan bishop on 6 January 1976 and served until 1984.

Honors
 Order of the Holy Sepulchre, for his contribution to theological dialogue and church unity. 
 Order of Saint John, by Queen of the United Kingdom Elizabeth II on 4 November 1977.
 Jordanian Order of Independence, by the King of Jordan Hussein bin Talal in 1983.

References

External links
 Photo: Anglican Bishop in Jerusalem Faik Haddad visits the United States, 7 October 1977
 List of Bishops of Jerusalem, Arabic Wikipedia

Anglican bishops of Jerusalem
1914 births
20th-century Anglican bishops in the Middle East
2001 deaths
American University of Beirut alumni
People educated at St George's School, Jerusalem
Palestinian Anglicans
People from Tulkarm
Recipients of the Order of Independence (Jordan)
Knights of the Holy Sepulchre
Chaplains of the Order of St John
20th-century Anglican archbishops